Polje Krapinsko is a village near Krapina, in Krapina-Zagorje County, Croatia. Area of Polje Krapinsko, Krapina is 0.332km2. Population is only 118. Male population is 57(48.4%) and Female population is 61(51.6%). Population change from 1975-2015 is +1.7. Timezone is Central European Summer Time.

References

Populated places in Krapina-Zagorje County